Sam Fox: Extreme Adventures is an Australian television programme for children and teenagers.

Production commenced in early 2013 with filming on various South Australian beaches and locales.
The 26 part series was produced by SLR Productions in South Australia and was first screened in 2014 on Eleven and Cartoon Network.

It was also aired in a subtitled Dutch language version on the Flemish public channel Ketnet from June 2015.
It was aired in a dubbed French language version on French public channel France 4 since 2015.

Cast 
The cast includes:
 Remy Brand as Sam Fox
 Stanley Browning as Sam's buddy, Rikki McGrath
 Harry Russell and Angus Russell as rascal twins Harry Fox and Jordan Fox, alias agents H and J, Sam's kid brothers
 Andrew Lindqvist as Nathan Fox, Sam's big brother
 Charles Mayer as Kingston Fox, Sam's father
 Luca Asta Sardelis as April Fox, Sam's grumpy younger sister
 Emily Bagg as Josie Brown
 Mavournee Hazel as Emma Fernley Granger
 Tiffany Lyndall-Knight as photographer Laura Fox, Sam's mother

Episodes 
(Episode information retrieved from Australian Television Information Archive).

References

External links 
 Sam Fox: Extreme Adventure at the Australian Television Information Archive
 Sam Fox: Extreme Adventures – SLR Productions promotional website
 IMDB, with episode summaries 
 Episodes 1-13
 Episodes 14-26

10 Peach original programming
Australian television series
2014 Australian television series debuts
2015 Australian television series endings
Television shows set in Adelaide